Untold: The Race of the Century is a 2022 American Netflix original documentary film directed by Chapman Way and Maclain Way. The film was released on September 6, 2022.

Summary 
The film is the ninth installment in the nine-part Untold: documentary film series. Its story follows The Australia II yacht crew who dethroned the New York Yacht Club at the 1983 America's Cup, breaking their 132-year win streak.

References

External links 
 
 
 

2022 films
2022 documentary films
American sports documentary films
2020s English-language films
1983 America's Cup